Barbra Fontana (born September 8, 1965) is a professional beach volleyball player from the United States who plays on the AVP Tour.  Fontana was the seventh woman to earn $1 million on the AVP Tour.

Fontana graduated from Stanford University in 1987 and earned a law degree in 1991.

References

External links
 
 
 
 

1965 births
Living people
American women's volleyball players
American women's beach volleyball players
Stanford Cardinal women's volleyball players
Sportspeople from Manhattan Beach, California